Contagion is the second studio album by American deathcore band Oceano, released November 9, 2010 through Earache Records. A video for "Weaponized" was released on November 4.

Track listing

Personnel
Adam Warren - vocals
Devin Shidaker - lead guitars
Nick Conser - rhythm guitars
Jason Jones - bass
Daniel Terchin - drums
Alex Erian - guest vocals
Steve Marois - guest vocals
Nick Arthur - guest vocals

Production
Produced, engineered & mixed by Chris «Zeuss» Harris
Vocal engineering by Antoine Lussier
Pre-production by Chuck Macak
Cover art & illustrations by Dusty Peterson
Layout by Summer Lacy
Photo by Jimmy Kurek

References

 

2010 albums
Earache Records albums
Oceano (band) albums
Albums produced by Chris "Zeuss" Harris